The Federal Labour Court is the court of the last resort for cases of labour law in Germany, both for individual labour law (mostly concerning contracts of employment) and collective labour law (e.g. cases concerning strikes and collective bargaining). The court hears cases from the Landesarbeitsgerichte (Superior State Labour Courts), which, in turn, are the courts of appeals against decisions of the Arbeitsgerichte (Inferior State Labour Courts).

The Bundesarbeitsgericht is located in the city of Erfurt.

External links

 

Erfurt
Germany
Courts in Germany
Labour courts
German labour law
Labor in Germany
1954 establishments in West Germany
Courts and tribunals established in 1954